Jacques Monclar (born 3 March 1957) is a French basketball player. He competed in the men's tournament at the 1984 Summer Olympics.

References

External links
 

1957 births
Living people
French men's basketball players
Olympic basketball players of France
Basketball players at the 1984 Summer Olympics
Limoges CSP coaches
Sportspeople from Neuilly-sur-Seine
1986 FIBA World Championship players